Scythostola is a genus of moth in the family Lecithoceridae. It contains the species Scythostola heptagramma, which is found in Indonesia (Java).

References

Lecithoceridae